Boshang is a small village in the Chinese province of Yunnan which has about 36,800 residents and an elevation of 2,226 meters. Boshang is situated northwest of Boduimen, and north of Manlai. The village is most known for being near Lincang Airport, located 22.5 km away from Boshang.

References 

Towns of Yunnan
Township-level divisions of Lincang